SERVO Magazine is a monthly robotics publication produced by T&L Publications. The first issue appeared in November 2003. SERVO Magazine was a primary sponsor behind the Tetsujin competition, a contest where teams were challenged to design robotic exoskeletons capable of lifting weights.

Columns
SERVO Magazine has a number of recurring columns that deal with various areas of robotics:
Mind/Iron, an editorial column with new authors virtually every month.
Twin Tweaks, a column dedicated to "hacking" robotics kits and imbuing them with new abilities.
Rubberbands and Bailing Wire, a column concerned with various electronics modifications that can be made to robots.
Lessons From The Laboratory, a column directed at a younger age group that features various projects with the LEGO Mindstorms robotics kit.
Combat Zone, a column that deals specifically with combat robotics and competitions.
Brain Matrix, a table of information on a variety of subjects, ranging from servo motors to batteries.
Ask Mr. Roboto, essentially in the form of an advice column, where readers write in with robotics projects related problems and questions.
Robytes, a short column that showcases interesting tidbits from the robotics world, ranging from new military projects to the creations of rogue tinkerers.
Menagerie, a short column where readers send in descriptions and pictures of their personal projects.
Then and Now, a column that recalls robots from the past.
Appetizer, a column at the end of the magazine that also is written by new authors every month.  Topics range from the serious to the frivolous.

Sponsorship
SERVO Magazine has been an active member of the robotics community, sponsoring such events as the FIRST Robotics Competition, the Robonexus robotics convention, and the Tetsujin robotics competition.

External links

 

Monthly magazines published in the United States
Science and technology magazines published in the United States
Magazines established in 2003
Magazines published in California
Robotics magazines